Journey to Nowhere (Spanish: Viaje sin destino) is a 1942 Spanish comedy film directed by Rafael Gil and starring Antonio Casal, Luchy Soto and Alberto Romea.

Synopsis 
The "Panoramas" travel agency is going through a precarious financial situation and to advertise itself organizes a journey without a destination: several passengers get on their bus and set off aimlessly.

Cast
 Luchy Soto as Rosario  
 Blanca Pozas as Doña O.  
 Fuensanta Lorente 
 Antonio Casal as Poveda  
 Alberto Romea as Garviza  
 Miguel Pozanco 
 Manuel Arbó as Rianza  
 José Prada as Bráñez  
 Jorge León as Venancio  
 Pedro Cabré as Presidente  
 Valeriano Ruiz París as Consejero  
 Alberto López 
 Camino Garrigó 
 Manrique Gil 
 Joaquín Torréns 
 Pedro Mascaró 
 Vicente Vega 
 Joaquín Cuquerella

References

Bibliography
 Labanyi, Jo & Pavlović, Tatjana. A Companion to Spanish Cinema. John Wiley & Sons, 2012.

External links 

1942 films
1942 comedy films
Spanish comedy films
1940s Spanish-language films
Films directed by Rafael Gil
Cifesa films
Films scored by Juan Quintero Muñoz
Spanish black-and-white films
1940s Spanish films